The 2012–13 RCD Espanyol season was the 112th season in the club's history.

Squad
The numbers and players are established according to the official website: www.rcdespanyol.com and www.lfp.es

Out on loan

Foreign players

  Cristian Álvarez
  Diego Colotto
  Juan Forlín
  Felipe Mattioni
  Wakaso Mubarak
 Héctor Moreno
  Juan Albín
  Christian Stuani

Competitions

Legend

La Liga

League table

Matches

Copa del Rey

Round of 32

Sources

Spanish football clubs 2012–13 season
2012–13
2012–13 in Catalan football